Shahi haleeb, shai haleeb, haleeb shai, shai Adeni, or shai mulaban is a Yemeni milk tea. It is made from black tea powder brewed in condensed or evaporated milk. Cardamom pods and cloves are usually added to the tea, some recipes include added sugar. The tea has a very sweet taste and is popular in Yemen and parts of the Arabian Peninsula.

Arabic words and phrases
Yemeni cuisine
Milk tea